Natural park may refer to:
 Nature park, a protected landscape (common term in some European countries)
 Protected area, some other types of protected areas in different countries

By country
 Natural park (Philippines)
 Natural park (Spain) (Spanish: parque natural)